Roberto Poluzzi (born 16 October 1936) is an Italian retired professional football player.

See also
Football in Italy
List of football clubs in Italy

References

1936 births
Living people
Italian footballers
Serie A players
Inter Milan players
Como 1907 players
Casale F.B.C. players
Association football midfielders